The third series of the British medical drama television series Casualty commenced airing in the United Kingdom on BBC One on 9 September 1988 and finished on 11 November 1988. This series consists of ten episodes, a decrease from the previous series. The broadcast of episode 10 was delayed until November 1988 following the death of guest actor Roy Kinnear. Succeeding episodes were brought forward one week in the schedule as a result.

Cast

Overview
The third series of Casualty features a cast of characters working in the emergency department of Holby City Hospital. The series began with 8 roles with star billing. Bernard Gallagher portrayed emergency medicine consultant Ewart Plimmer. Derek Thompson appeared as charge nurse Charlie Fairhead, whilst Brenda Fricker played state enrolled nurse Megan Roach. Cathy Shipton and Eddie Nestor starred as staff nurses Lisa "Duffy" Duffin and Cyril James. Ella Wilder and Geoffrey Leesley portrayed paramedics Shirley Franklin and Keith Cotterill. Christopher Rozycki portrayed porter Kuba Trzcinski. Brian Capron also appeared in two episodes as locum emergency medicine medical registrar Peter.

Gallagher chose to leave the show, with Ewart being killed off in episode five. Five new cast members joined the series in episode 1: Paul Lacoux as senior house officer David Rowe; Julie Graham and Shaheen Khan as student nurses Allison McGrellis and Kiran Joghill; Carol Leader as receptionist Sadie Tomkins; and Susan Franklyn as administrator Valerie Sinclair. Lacoux, Graham, Khan and Leader departed the series at its conclusion. Wilder and Rozycki also departed at the end of the series.

Main characters 

Susan Franklyn as Valerie Sinclair (from episode 1)
Brenda Fricker as Megan Roach

Julie Graham as Allison McGrellis (episodes 1−15)
Shaheen Khan as Kiran Joghill (episodes 1−15)
Paul Lacoux as David Rowe (episodes 1−15)
Carol Leader as Sadie Tomkins (episodes 1−15)
Geoffrey Leesley as Keith Cotterill
Eddie Nestor as Cyril James

Cathy Shipton as Lisa "Duffy" Duffin
Derek Thompson as Charlie Fairhead
Ella Wilder as Shirley Franklin (until episode 15)

Guest characters 
Brian Capron as Peter (episodes 3)

Episodes

References

External links
 Casualty series 3 at the Internet Movie Database

03
1988 British television seasons